Sam Ball is a filmmaker, director, and producer. He co-founded Citizen Film, a San Francisco-based not-for-profit production company which "creates films and online media that foster active engagement in cultural and civic life."

Ball received his BA from McGill University in Montreal and his MA in Communication (Documentary Film) from Stanford University in 1996.

His documentaries have been exhibited at the Sundance Film Festival, the Museum of Modern Art, New York, Paris’ Pompidou Centre and on public television.

External links 
 Sam Ball Biography
 Citizen Film

References

American filmmakers
McGill University alumni
Stanford University School of Humanities and Sciences alumni
Cinema of the San Francisco Bay Area
People from the San Francisco Bay Area
Living people
Year of birth missing (living people)